Lorraine is the sixth studio album from American folk music singer Lori McKenna.  Released January 25, 2011 on Signature Sounds, the album reached No. 6 on the Billboard Folk Albums chart.

The title of the album is actually about the loss of McKenna’s mother (her namesake) whom she lost when she was 6 years old.

Reception

Lorraine received positive reviews from critics. On Metacritic, the album holds a score of 73/100 based on 6 reviews, indicating "generally favorable reviews".

Track listing 
 The Luxury of Knowing 
 The Most 
 If He Tried 
 Lorraine 
 You Get a Love Song
 Rocket Science 
 Buy This Town
 All I Ever Do 
 That's How You Know
 Sweet Disposition
 American Revolver 
 Ladders and Parachutes 
 Still Down Here

Personnel 
 Chris Carmichael - strings
Kim Carnes – background vocals
John Catchings – cello
Perry Coleman – background vocals
J.T. Corenflos – electric guitar
Eric Darken – drums, percussion
Barry Dean – keyboards, background vocals
Will Denton – drums, percussion
Mike Durham – electric guitar
Vicki Hampton – background vocals
Jaime Hanna – background vocals
Sean McConnell – background vocals
Pat McGrath – acoustic guitar
Lori McKenna – acoustic guitar, lead vocals, background vocals
Pat McLaughlin – mandolin 
Jeff Roach – drums, keyboards, percussion
Jonathan Singleton – background vocals
Jimmie Lee Sloas – bass guitar
Walt Wilkins – background vocals
Craig Young – bass guitar

Charts

References

External links
 

Lori McKenna albums
2011 albums